Relative gain, in international relations, is the actions of states only in respect to power balances and without regard to other factors, such as economics. In international relations, cooperation may be necessary to balance power, but concerns about relative gains will limit that cooperation due to the low quality of information about other states' behavior and interests. Such relative-gains concerns, however, may sometimes be mitigated by individual social preferences.

Relative gain is related to zero-sum game, which states that wealth cannot be expanded and the only way a state can become richer is to take wealth from another state. It differs from absolute gain, which is the total effect of a decision on the state or organization, regardless of gains made by others.

References

International relations terminology